The 12955 / 12956 Mumbai Central - Jaipur Superfast Express is one of the most important train of Western Railway running between Mumbai in Maharashtra and Jaipur in Rajasthan, India. It was the first direct train between these two cities. It is the fastest train under Superfast category of trains;  which are running between Mumbai and Jaipur.

Overview 
This train is the first broad-gauge train from Jaipur Junction and it came into service on 30 January 1993. Jaipur Superfast is also informally known as Gangaur Express.

It operates as train number 12955 in Down direction from Mumbai Central to Jaipur Junction and in Up direction as train number 12956 between Jaipur Junction & Mumbai Central. It covers a distance of 1162 kilometers in 16 hrs 45 mins with an average speed of 70 km/h (with halts) in Down Direction. In Up direction, the journey is completed in 16 hrs 55 mins at an average speed of 70 km/h (with halts). The train runs at maximum speed of 130 km/hr. The train is equipped with Bio toilets. A scheme of meal coupons was first experimented on this train.

Important Halts

The train halts at important stations such as Borivali, Surat, Vadodara, Ratlam, Kota, Sawai Madhopur and Durgapura in Down and Up directions.

Schedule 
It leaves Mumbai Central at 19:05 hrs and arrives at Jaipur on the next day at 11.50 hrs.

After halting at Jaipur it starts journey at 14.00 hrs; back to Mumbai Central and reaches there on the next day at 06.55 hrs.

Coach composition 
The train is running with LHB coach effectively from 1 November 2019.
The train has total 22 coaches with 1 end-on-generator car, 1 coach of First AC CUM Second AC Coach, 1 coach of Second AC Coach, 6 coaches of Third AC, 8 coaches of Second Sleeper, 3 unreserved coaches, 1 Pantry Car and 1 High Capacity Parcel Van both down and up services.

Traction 

Prior to DC to AC Conversion of Western Line Suburban Railway in Mumbai; it departed from Mumbai Central with a Valsad Loco Shed WCAM 2/2P locomotive in order to use Mumbai's DC traction wires. There was a locomotive change at Vadodara where it used to swap the WCAM 2/2P for a Vadodara Loco Shed  WAP 4E .

At Sawai Madhopur Junction it got a WDP 4/4B/4D from Bhagat Ki Kothi shed for its remaining journey upto Jaipur. Sawai Madhopur Junction is also where it gets a reversal in direction.
 
The Western railway completed DC to AC electric conversion on 5 February 2012. After the complete AC electrification of Western Line suburban system in Mumbai; it was hauled by WAP 5 or WAP 4E between Mumbai Central and Sawai Madhopur Junction.

North Western Railway completed electrification of Jaipur - Sawai Madhopur rail route in August, 2021. Now it is haul by a Vadodara Loco Shed based WAP 7 locomotive for its end-to-end journey.

Gallery 

Express trains in India
Mumbai
Jaipur